Ashleigh Barty was the defending champion, having won the event in 2012, but decided to participate in the 2013 Birmingham Classic that week.

Britain's Elena Baltacha defeated Tadeja Majerič of Slovenia 7–5, 7–6(9–7) in the final, to claim the 2013 title.

Seeds

Main draw

Finals

Top half

Bottom half

References 
 Main draw

Nottingham Challenge - Women's Singles
2013 Women's Singles